The AFL video game series is a series of Australian rules football video games based on the AFL. Released originally by Beam Software, it has since been developed by several other game developers.

Games in the series

Aussie Rules Footy

Developer: Beam Software
Publisher: Mattel
Released for: NES
Release date: 1991

It was the first AFL video game. The game involves playing a game of Australian rules football from a third-person perspective, with the ability to perform the basic actions of a typical player of the sport. The game can be played by one person, or by two players against each other. There is also a kick to kick mode, and a season mode where one to six players can play multiple games in a season finishing with a grand final. It was developed by Beam Software, and was published by Mattel.

AFL Finals Fever
Developer: Blue Tongue Entertainment
Publisher: Cadability, EA Sports
Released for: Microsoft Windows
Release date: 1996

It was released for Windows PC only on 9 June 1996. You could play as one of the 16 clubs of the 1996 AFL season. It was also the last video game in the series to feature the Fitzroy Lions and the Brisbane Bears as playable teams before they were merged. The game was also the first game to be developed by Blue Tongue Entertainment and was published by Cadability.

AFL 98
Developer: Creative Assembly
Publisher: EA Sports
Released for: Microsoft Windows
Release date: 1997

It was released in 1997 for Microsoft Windows. It is also the first game in the series to have commentary, which was provided by Bruce McAvaney. The game was developed by Creative Assembly and published by EA Sports.

AFL 99
Developer: Creative Assembly
Publisher: EA Sports
Released for: PlayStation, Microsoft Windows
Release date: 1998

It was released in 1998 for the PlayStation and Microsoft Windows. It was based on the 1998 season and you could play as any of the 16 teams. The commentary is provided by Bruce McAvaney and Leigh Matthews. The game was developed by Creative Assembly and published by EA Sports. The game's music was composed by Jeff van Dyck.

Kevin Sheedy AFL Coach 2002
Developer: IR Gurus
Publisher: Acclaim Entertainment
Released for: Microsoft Windows
Release date: 2001

It was the first AFL video game to be developed by IR Gurus. The game was released as a PC only game. In the game you assume the role of an AFL Coach, you tell your players commands such as the type of play you want them to play (attacking, defensive, Normal) and when to interchange. It sold well for a "then" IR Gurus game but not too well on the market.

AFL Live 2003
Developer: IR Gurus
Publisher: Acclaim Entertainment
Released for: Microsoft Windows, PlayStation 2, Xbox
Release date: 2002

It was released for Microsoft Windows, PlayStation 2 and Xbox. The game is based on the 2002 AFL season with team rosters. It was first released on 5 September 2002 in Australia. It was developed by IR Gurus and published by Acclaim Entertainment. It is also the first game in the series to feature a live action intro of AFL games in the 2003 season. The game was only released in Australia.

AFL Live 2004
Developer: IR Gurus
Publisher: Acclaim Entertainment
Released for: Microsoft Windows, PlayStation 2, Xbox
Release date: 2003

It was released for Microsoft Windows, PlayStation 2 and Xbox on 28 August 2003. The game is based on the 2003 AFL season with team rosters based on that year. AFL Live 2003 includes all 16 official AFL teams and 8 stadiums which were, MCG, Telstra Dome, Optus Oval, Kardinia Park, AAMI Stadium, Subiaco Oval, Gabba, SCG. It also included all 22 home and away matches and the finals series. The game was published by Acclaim with the song Lost Control by Grinspoon as the intro song. It was developed by IR Gurus.

AFL Live: Premiership Edition
Developer: IR Gurus
Publisher: Acclaim Entertainment, THQ
Released for: Microsoft Windows (THQ), PlayStation 2, Xbox (Acclaim)
Release date: 2004

It was released for Microsoft Windows, PlayStation 2 and Xbox on 29 April 2004. The game is based on the 2004 AFL season with team rosters based on that year. It was developed by IR Gurus and was the final AFL game to be published by Acclaim Entertainment, before their bankruptcy on 1 September 2004.

AFL Premiership 2005

Developer: IR Gurus
Publisher: Sony Computer Entertainment, THQ
Released for:  Microsoft Windows, PlayStation 2 (Sony Computer Entertainment), Xbox (THQ)
Release date: 2005

It is based on the 2005 AFL season and was released only for the PlayStation 2. This is the next edition after AFL Premiership Edition. When Acclaim shut down its operations in Australia, Sony Computer Entertainment got publishing and distributing rights to the game. Because Sony Computer Entertainment had an exclusive period with the title, initially it was only launched on PlayStation 2. However, THQ released a Microsoft Windows and Xbox version of the game. It was released on 22 September 2005 and is only available in Australia.

AFL Premiership 2006
Developer: IR Gurus
Publisher: Sony Computer Entertainment
Released for: PlayStation 2
Release date: 2006

AFL Premiership 2006 is the tenth game in the series. a follow-up to AFL Premiership 2005, it is based on the 2006 AFL season and was released only for the PlayStation 2. The revamped kicking system requires the players to time the button presses to kick straight, because holding it down for too long results in the ball turning in the opposite side. There are several modes: training mode (provides the basics), short match, Wizard Cup, Premiership and Finals. A newly introduced multiseason allows the management of certain team aspects. That includes things like improving player skills, trading players at the end of the season, and putting the emphasis on draft.

AFL Premiership 2007

Developer: IR Gurus
Publisher: Sony Computer Entertainment
Released for: PlayStation 2
Release date: 2007

It is a simulation game for the PlayStation 2 based on the AFL. The game marks the final AFL game to be developed by Australian games company IR Gurus and was published by Sony Computer Entertainment, IR Gurus seventh collaboration in the series, and was released on 28 June 2007. The game includes all 16 teams, more than 600 AFL players with updated stats and all of the major stadium. Game modes in AFL Premiership 2007 are Single Match, Season Mode, Career Mode, Mission Mode and Training Mode. It was a follow-up to AFL Premiership 2006.

AFL Challenge

Developer: Wicked Witch Software
Publisher: Tru Blu Entertainment, Sony Computer Entertainment
Released for: PlayStation Portable
Release date: 2009

It was released for the PlayStation Portable. The game was developed by Wicked Witch Software and co-published by Tru Blu Entertainment and Sony Computer Entertainment. It was released on 10 September 2009. The game is based on the 2009 AFL season and includes all 16 teams and players.

AFL Live

Developer: Big Ant Studios
Publisher: Tru Blu Entertainment
Released for: Microsoft Windows, PlayStation 3, Xbox 360 
Release date: 2011, 2012

It was released for Microsoft Windows, PlayStation 3 and Xbox 360 based on the 2011 AFL season. It was developed by Big Ant Studios and released on 21 April 2011. The Game of the Year Edition, an updated version of the game for the 2012 AFL season was released on 6 June 2012.

AFL (2011) 

 Developer: Wicked Witch Software
 Publisher: Tru Blu Entertainment
 Released for: Wii
 Release date: 19 May 2011

It was released for Wii the same year as AFL Live, based on the 2011 AFL season. It features more management mechanics than Live, with a ten-year campaign, as well as multiplayer of up to 8 players. As with the other systems, a Game of the Year edition with 2012 players and locales was again released in June 2012.

AFL Live 2

Developer: Wicked Witch Software
Publisher: Tru Blu Entertainment
Released for: PlayStation 3, Xbox 360, iOS, Android
Release date: 2013, 2014, 2015 

It was released for PlayStation 3 and Xbox 360 on 12 September 2013. The 2014 Season Pack was released on 30 June 2014 for Xbox 360 and PlayStation 3 on 9 July 2014. A mobile port was released on iOS  on 28 May 2015 and Android on 26 September 2015.

AFL Evolution

Developer: Wicked Witch Software 
Publisher: Tru Blu Entertainment
Released for: Microsoft Windows, PlayStation 4, Xbox One
Release date: 2017, 2018

It was released for Microsoft Windows, PlayStation 4 and Xbox One. It was developed by Wicked Witch Software and was released on May 5, 2017 for PlayStation 4 and Xbox One, with the Microsoft Windows version released on July 21, 2017 via Steam. The 2018 Season Pack was later released on May 3, 2018.

AFL Evolution 2
Developer: Wicked Witch Software
Publisher: Tru Blu Entertainment
Released for: Microsoft Windows, PlayStation 4, Xbox One, Nintendo Switch
Release date: April 16, 2020 (PlayStation 4 and Xbox One). May 14, 2020 (Nintendo Switch). September 11, 2020 (Microsoft Windows).

It was released for Microsoft Windows, PlayStation 4, Xbox One and Nintendo Switch.

AFL 23
Developer: Big Ant Studios
Publisher: Big Ant Studios
Released for: Microsoft Windows, PlayStation 4, Xbox One, PlayStation 5, Xbox Series X/S
Release date: April 13th 2023 

Due for release on April 13th 2023. 

AFL 23 will feature all 18 AFL and AFLW teams with over 1200 players across the AFL/AFLW, with motion-captured animation, photo-realistic likenesses, in-depth skills and unique player traits powered by Champion Data. 

The game is being developed by Big Ant Studios with the developer previously releasing AFL Live in 2011.

Other titles
AFL Mascot Manor
It was released for the Nintendo DS on 2 July 2009. Focused more on the League's Mascots than on the sport itself, the central component of the game is the adventure the players Mascot will experience in the themed worlds.
AFL: Gold Edition
Is an iOS AFL simulation video game based on the 2011 AFL season, released on 14 December 2011. The 2012 AFL season update was released on 4 June 2012. It was developed by Wicked Witch Software and had similar gameplay to AFL on the Wii.

References

 
1996 video games
Australia-exclusive video games
Australian rules football video games
Video games developed in Australia
Video games scored by Jeff van Dyck
Video games set in Australia
Articles which contain graphical timelines
Windows games
Windows-only games
PlayStation 2 games
Xbox games
PlayStation (console) games